Ryzhenkov is a Russian masculine surname, its feminine counterpart is Ryzhenkova. It may refer to

Oleg Ryzhenkov (born 1967), Belarusian world champion biathlete
Viktor Ryzhenkov (born 1966), Uzbekistani pole vaulter
Vladimir Ryzhenkov (1948–2011), Russian weightlifter 
Vladimir Ryzhenkov (politician), former Belarusian Minister for Sport and Belarus Olympic Committee president

Russian-language surnames